Kairothamnus is a genus of plants under the family Picrodendraceae described as a genus in 1980. The only known species is Kairothamnus phyllanthoides, endemic to Morobe Province in Papua New Guinea.

See also
Taxonomy of the Picrodendraceae

References

Picrodendraceae
Monotypic Malpighiales genera
Flora of New Guinea